This is a list of military conflicts in which Somali armed forces participated in after independence.

References

Somalia
 
Wars